Oliver Michael Rathbone (born 10 October 1996) is an English professional footballer who plays as a central midfielder for EFL Championship club Rotherham United.

Career

Early career
Rathbone started in the youth ranks of Manchester United. On 21 February 2015, Rathbone scored a 40-yard winner in an U18s game against Derby County. The goal won Manchester United's Goal of the Month award. After failing to make the breakthrough at Manchester United, Rathbone was released in June 2016.

Rochdale
On 24 June, Rathbone agreed to join EFL League One side Rochdale, signing a one-year contract. He made his competitive debut on 4 October in the EFL Trophy against Notts County. Days later, Rathbone made his first league appearance in a win over Southend United. Rathbone netted his first goal over Walsall in November.

After two goals in thirty-three appearances in his debut season, Rathbone signed a new contract with the club until June 2019 on 18 August 2017. His 100th match for Rochdale arrived on 9 March 2019 during a victory versus Shrewsbury Town. He was offered a new contract by Rochdale at the end of the 2018–19 season. On 24 June, Rathbone signed a new three-year deal to keep him under contract until the summer of 2022.

Rotherham United
On 4 August 2021, Rathbone signed a three-year contract with Rotherham United for an undisclosed fee. He made his debut in the first game of the 2021–22 season against Plymouth Argyle on 7 August 2021, coming on as a second half substitute. He scored his first goal for the club on 25 September 2021, against Crewe.

Personal life
He is the son of former footballer Mick Rathbone.

Career statistics

Honours
Rotherham United
League One runner-up: 2021–22
EFL Trophy: 2021–22

References

External links

1996 births
Living people
Footballers from Blackburn
English footballers
Association football midfielders
Rochdale A.F.C. players
Rotherham United F.C. players
English Football League players